George Smith (19 November 1785 – 3 April 1838) was an English cricketer who played for Nottingham Cricket Club from 1817 to 1827.  He made three first-class appearances, all for Nottingham, between 1826 and 1827.

References

1785 births
1838 deaths
English cricketers
English cricketers of 1826 to 1863
Nottingham Cricket Club cricketers